The 82nd Indianapolis 500 was held at the Indianapolis Motor Speedway in Speedway, Indiana on Sunday, May 24, 1998.  This was the first Indianapolis 500 fully sanctioned by the Indy Racing League after the IRL relied on USAC to sanction the 1996–1997 races. The race was part of the 1998 Pep Boys Indy Racing League season.

Eddie Cheever Jr., a former Formula One competitor and Indy rookie in 1990, highlighted his racing career with this lone Indianapolis win. Cheever finished three seconds ahead of second place Buddy Lazier, the 1996 winner. The 1998 race ushered in a compacted, two-week schedule for the Indy 500, omitting an entire week of practice, and trimming qualifying from four days down to two.

During time trials, Billy Boat secured the first pole position at Indy for the Foyt team since 1975.

This was the first Indianapolis victory for the Dallara chassis. In the second year utilizing the 4.0 L, normally aspirated, 32-valve production-based engines (Aurora L47 and Infiniti VH), qualifying speeds climbed, topping out nearly six miles per hour faster than 1997.

Schedule

Background

Continuing split from CART
The ongoing IRL/CART split continued into its third year. The two series began moving further apart, and for the second time, no major teams from the CART ranks entered at Indianapolis. CART teams raced on Saturday at the Motorola 300.

Rule changes
After controversy in 1997, the "25/8 Rule", which locked in entries to the starting field based on points standings, was scrapped for 1998. The 33-car field would revert to the traditional 33 fastest qualifiers.

For 1998, the schedule for the month of May was trimmed down, in an effort to reduce costs. An experimental "two-week" schedule was proposed, consisting of one full week of practice, and two days of time trials. An open test was scheduled in April which also included rookie orientation.

During qualifying, once the field is filled to 33, cars that subsequently bump their way into the field on the second day of time trials (Bump Day) will at that moment be (tentatively) slotted in the 33rd starting position, regardless of their overall speed rank on the second day. Previously cars that bumped their way into the field lined up based on speed rank of the day they qualified. The change was made to encourage more cars qualifying on pole day. As a result, the field was lined up the order of: first day (pole day) qualifiers, followed by second day qualifiers (those that qualified before the field was filled to 33), followed by cars that bumped their way into the field on the second day.

A new rule change for 1998 allowed cars to return to the garage area to make repairs and subsequently re-enter the race. Previously, all repairs (whether major or minor) had to be done in the pit area only. Prior to 1998, any car that crossed the entrance to Gasoline Alley was ruled out of the race, regardless of its condition. Likewise, any stalled car towed back to the garage area through escape roads in the infield (instead of around the track itself) was ruled out of the race, even if the issue was something as harmless as running out of fuel (that aspect of the rule was the source of controversy in the 1972 race with Jim Hurtubise). The repair rule change was made at the request of teams, which considered it a safety measure, as well as a fair way to allow more cars to finish the race. Pit crew members working for extended periods of time on the actual pit lane felt exposed to injuries/accidents from other cars entering and exiting the pits literally inches away. It also allowed them access to necessary tools and allowed them to make major repairs. This new rule was similar in practice to the policy that NASCAR had, where cars are allowed to "go behind the wall" to make repairs and re-enter the competition. A limit was enforced, however, such that no car could make repairs and re-enter the race after the leaders completed 190 laps.

Practice

Sunday May 10
Opening day saw Mike Groff take the honor of "first car on the track." Crashes during the day were suffered by Jack Hewitt and Jimmy Kite, neither were serious. Robbie Buhl was the fastest car of the day, at 219.325 mph.

Monday May 11
Tony Stewart led the speed chart, with a lap of 223.703 mph. It was the fastest lap since the normally aspirated engine formula was adopted in 1997. Eight drivers in total broke the 200 mph barrier.

Danny Ongais suffered the most serious crash thus far for the month, and was sidelined with a concussion. Arie Luyendyk, Mike Groff, Raul Boesel and Tony Stewart all suffered mechanical problems, and required tows back to the garage area.

Off the track, Eddie Cheever announced a sponsorship deal with Rachel's Gourmet Potato Chips.

Tuesday May 12
Tony Stewart nearly matched his speed from a day before, with a fast lap of 223.691 mph. Second best Kenny Bräck was a full 2 mph slower at 221.593 mph.

Sunny skies, with temperatures in the 70s greeted the Speedway for the third day in a row.

Wednesday May 13
Moisture from an overnight shower delayed the start of practice for about a half-hour. Billy Boat took the honors for fastest of the day at 221.691 mph, while Tony Stewart sat out the day. Temperatures topped out at 80 degrees late in the day.

Thursday May 14
Jimmy Kite suffered his second wall contact of the week, backing the car into the wall in turn 4. Another warm, 83 degree afternoon saw Tony Stewart once again on top of the speed chart (223.430 mph).

"Fast" Friday May 15
The final day of practice before pole day was warm, with a high of 81 degrees. Tony Stewart topped the speed chart with the fastest lap of the month (223.797 mph). Kenny Bräck and Billy Boat were also over 221 mph.

Boat, however, wrecked his primary car in turn 3 shortly after the 11 a.m. start. Also spinning in a separate incident (but not making contact) was Jack Hewitt.

At the close of practice, Tony Stewart entered time trials as the favorite for the pole position. Stewart led the speed chart on four of the six days of practice (sitting out one day). Foyt drivers Kenny Bräck and Billy Boat were also front row favorites, however, Boat's crash on Friday seemed to dim his chances.

Time trials

Pole Day – Saturday May 16
Pole day dawned sunny and clear, with temperatures in the high 70s. Qualifying started on-time promptly at 11 a.m., but saw two early wave-offs. The first two notable runs were put in by Robbie Buhl (220.236 mph) and Tony Stewart (220.386 mph), but the speeds were down from their expectations.

At noon, Kenny Bräck took over the provisional pole with a run of 220.982 mph. Minutes later, Jimmy Kite crashed for the third time of the week. At 12:45 p.m., Billy Boat took to the track for his run. His first lap was a remarkable 224.573 mph, the fastest lap of the month. The three other laps dropped off, but his four-lap average of 223.503 mph was fast enough to secure the pole position.

Sixteen cars completed runs before the mid-afternoon down time. Around 4:15 p.m., qualifying resumed, with drivers Scott Sharp and Eddie Cheever among those making the field. At 5:15 p.m., Greg Ray squeezed onto the front row, as the second-fastest qualifier (221.125 mph).

At the end of the day, the field was filled to 26 cars, after a record 42 qualifying attempts. Among the notables not yet in the field were Arie Luyendyk, Lyn St. James, and Jeff Ward. Luyendyk suffered through engine trouble most of the day.

Billy Boat's unexpected speed in qualifying drew the attention of competitors, given that it occurred in the heat of the day, and it was 2½ miles per hour faster than he had run all week. Team Menard threatened to protest, and accused Foyt Racing of cheating by illegally using nitrous. The Indy Racing League took no action, and Boat was not penalized.

Bump Day – Sunday May 17
With seven positions remaining in the field, the second and final day of time trials saw heavy activity. In the first hour, veterans Raul Boesel, Arie Luyendyk and Jeff Ward were among the early qualifiers. Scott Harrington, however, blew an engine and wrecked on his second lap, which put a halt to qualifying for nearly 45 minutes.

In the heat of the day (1:52 p.m.), Eliseo Salazar completed a run at 216.259 mph, the second-slowest in the field. His run was followed by a long down-time, as teams waited for optimum conditions.

At 4:30 p.m., qualifying resumed, and several cars took to the track. During the next hour, 13 attempts were made, but only 5 were run to completion. After three wrecks for the week, Jimmy Kite found the needed speed, and managed to fill the field to 33 cars at 4:55 p.m. With Billy Roe (215.781 mph) the first driver on the bubble, Mike Groff bumped him out at 5:23 p.m. That put Eliseo Salazar (216.259 mph) on the bubble. Minutes later, Roe went back out and bumped his way back into the field. The move placed Johnny Unser (216.316 mph) now on the bubble.

Claude Bourbonnais, Dan Drinan, and Lyn St. James all fell short of Johnny Unser's speed, and failed to bump him out. With four minutes remaining, Eliseo Salazar scrambled into Stan Wattles' back-up car, but managed only 211 mph on the first two laps. The car began smoking, and he was waved off. The 6 o'clock gun fired with Hideshi Matsuda waiting in line.

With Lyn St. James having failed to qualify, the 500 had an all-male field for the first time since 1991.

Carb Day - Thursday May 21
The final practice session saw the Foyt entries of Kenny Bräck and Billy Boat top the speed chart. Bräck (220.994 mph) was the only driver over 220 mph. No incidents were reported, but Stan Wattles twice stalled on the track with mechanical problems.

Panther Racing with driver Scott Goodyear won the Coors Indy Pit Stop Challenge.

Starting grid

Alternates
First alternate:   Eliseo Salazar (#15) - Bumped
Second alternate:  Lyn St. James (#90) - Too slow

Failed to qualify
 #20  Tyce Carlson - practice crash
 #27  Claude Bourbonnais
 #29  Joe Gosek
 #54  Hideshi Matsuda
 #66  Scott Harrington
 #24  Dan Drinan 
 #23  Paul Durant

Race recap

Pre race
Rain fell race morning, and delayed the start of the race by about 35 minutes. While track drying efforts were on-going, a dog sneaked out onto the track in turn four, and began running down the pit lane. It eluded officials, and ran all the way to turn two before being caught. Mari Hulman George gave the command to start engines at 11:32 a.m. EST, and the field pulled away for the parade laps.

Start
At the start, Eddie Cheever got loose in turn one, and pitched J. J. Yeley down to the inside. Yeley did a half-spin in turn one, and made slight contact with Cheever. Cheever continued unharmed while Yeley managed to control and stop the car without hitting the wall. Yeley's engine stalled, and he lost a lap before while he awaited a restart by safety crews.

At the front of the pack, Billy Boat led the first dozen laps. On lap 13, Greg Ray took over the lead, with Tony Stewart charging in third. On lap 21, Robbie Buhl became hung up in traffic, and Stewart dove into the lead down the main stretch. One lap later, however, Stewart's engine blew and the car coasted to a stop in turn one. A dejected Stewart, suffering misfortune in his third straight "500", blurted out on live television "This has been my number one goal; every year I get shit on."

First half
Robbie Buhl (Stewart's teammate) also blew an engine, dropping out on lap 45. As the green came out on lap 49, a major crash occurred in turn 3. Several cars were running two-wide as they approached turn three. Sam Schmidt, running inside of Davey Hamilton, got into the grass, lost control, and spun backwards into the turn three wall. Eddie Cheever, immediately behind, slipped underneath, and escaped the incident. Stan Wattles ran into the back of Mark Dismore, and they collected Roberto Guerrero. Billy Roe was left with nowhere to go, and was caught up in the incident. Jim Guthrie then approached the scene and ran over debris, which caused the car to pinch down and cut through the grass. He hit an errant rear wing, and the car shot head-on into the outside wall. Guthrie was transported to Methodist Hospital with a broken elbow, broken leg, and cracked ribs.
 
After a long yellow flag, and series of pit stops, Kenny Bräck and Eddie Cheever worked into their lead, with Arie Luyendyk and Buddy Lazier also amongst the top five.

Second half
John Paul Jr. took the lead at the halfway point, and traded the lead with Eddie Cheever over the next 50 laps. After earlier gearbox troubles, Billy Boat finally dropped out for good on lap 132, then Arie Luyendyk lost a clutch on lap 153.

By lap 160, Eddie Cheever led Buddy Lazier with rookie Steve Knapp the only other car on the lead lap. John Paul Jr.'s chances for a win died when he stalled four times trying to exit the pits on lap 177. He lost three laps, and was in the pits for almost four minutes.

Finish
With 17 laps to go, a restart saw Cheever leading Lazier by 1.1 seconds. Cheever stretched the lead to over 3 seconds, but another yellow on lap 191 was brought out by the smoking car of Marco Greco.

With five laps to go, the green came back out, and Lazier was nose-to-tail with Cheever. Cheever held off the challenge, and stretched out to a 3.19-second margin to victory. Steve Knapp, the only other driver to finish on the lead lap, was named rookie of the year.

Box score

 – former Indianapolis 500 winner;  – Denotes Rookie Candidate

*C Chassis: D=Dallara, G=G-Force, R=Riley & Scott

*E Engine: I=Infiniti, O=Oldsmobile

*T Tire: F=Firestone, G=Goodyear

Broadcasting

Radio
The race was carried live on the Indy Racing Radio Network. The network, previously known as the Indianapolis Motor Speedway Radio Network, had changed its name for 1998, to reflect its coverage of the entire Indy Racing League season. At least 541 affiliates carried the broadcast across the United States.

Bob Jenkins served as chief announcer for the ninth and final year. It would be Jenkins 20th and final year on the radio network crew (until his brief return in 2007-2008). In addition, Jerry Baker celebrated his milestone 25th year on the broadcast.

Johnny Rutherford served as "driver expert." WTHR sports director and Speedway public address announcer Dave Calabro joined the crew as a pit reporter, his lone radio network appearance. This was also Gary Lee's final year on the radio network.

Television
The race was carried live flag-to-flag coverage in the United States on ABC Sports. Paul Page served as host and play-by-play announcer with Tom Sneva as analyst. Longtime color commentator Bobby Unser left ABC, while Danny Sullivan was reassigned to cover CART races exclusively and would no longer be with the broadcast. This would be Page's final 500 for the next three years. After the 1998 season, Page would move exclusively to CART series broadcasts while being replaced in 1999 by soon to be former voice of the 500 Bob Jenkins.

For the first time since the early 1980s, one of the pit reporters (Gary Gerould) rode in the pace car, reporting live at the start of the race. During the broadcast itself, Brent Musburger had a small role as Wide World of Sports studio host.

At the track itself, the Speedway broadcast the race live on a special targeted signal, intended to be picked up by television sets within the radius of the grounds. This was the first and only time this special signal has been used.
 

Practice and time trials were carried over three networks: ABC, ESPN, and ESPN2. 
Live Daily Reports (ESPN2): Paul Page, Jon Beekhuis, Jerry Punch, Jack Arute, Gary Gerould
Time trials (ABC): Paul Page, Tom Sneva, Jack Arute, Gary Gerould, Brent Musberger (studio host)
Time trials (ESPN/ESPN2): Paul Page, Jon Beekhuis, Jerry Punch, Gary Gerould

Gallery

Notes

References

Works cited
1998 Indianapolis 500 Daily Trackside Report for the Media
Indianapolis 500 History: Race & All-Time Stats - Official Site
1998 Indianapolis 500 Radio Broadcast, Indianapolis Motor Speedway Radio Network

Indianapolis 500 races
Indianapolis 500
Indianapolis 500
Indianapolis 500
Indianapolis 500
May 1998 sports events in the United States